Confey GAA is a Gaelic Athletic Association (GAA) club based in Leixlip, County Kildare, Ireland and won Kildare's Club of the Year award in 2004.

History
On 19 January 1989, a meeting was held in the home of Michael Divilly for those who were interested in creating a separate GAA club for the northern half of Leixlip in the parish of Confey. At this meeting it was agreed to hold a public meeting to gain further support for the foundation of a new club, which was subsequently held in the local school on 30 January. Following this meeting a formal approach was made to the Kildare County board, and Confey was formally registered as a club on 27 February 1989. The club's first official match came in March, with the men's football team losing to Cappagh on a scoreline of 2–3 to 2–2. The club acquired six and a half acres at Cope Bridge in 1990, followed by a further three and a half acres the following year. The club's first chairman was Pat Sweeney. In 1998 the club opened a new clubhouse, with a bar, sportshall, and several dressing rooms. The club's facilities at Cope Bridge are named Creighton Park in memory of Jimmy Creighton who was one of the early members of the club and club chairman in 1990 and 1991.

Gaelic football
Confey's first title at adult football level came in 1995 when the Confey under 21 footballers beat Maynooth to claim the 1995 Kildare Under 21 Football B Championship. Confey footballers were promoted to Kildare Senior Football League Division – 2 in 1999 and gained promotion to division 1 in 2001. 2002 saw Confey minor (Under 18) footballers winning the 2002 Kildare Minor Football Championship beating Celbridge in a replayed final after a drawn first game, the senior footballer also claimed the club first title at that level by winning the 2002 Kildare Junior Football "Keogh" Cup. Confey won the Kildare Junior Football Championship in 2003 beating Nurney in the final which made up for being relegated from the division 1 league. Confey won the 2004 Senior Football League Division – 2 beating Rathangan 0–7 v 0–6 in Clane. In 2006 Confey won the Kildare Intermediate Football Championship v St. Kevin's and went on to beat Tubber (Offaly) in the 2006 Leinster GAA Intermediate Club Championship Final. Confey won the 2008 Kildare Senior Football "Aldridge" Cup beating Sarsfields in the final. 2009 saw the footballers relegated from the senior to intermediate grade after a one-point loss to Naas in a relegation playoff. 2012 saw the team return to the senior grade as a result of winning the 2011 Kildare Intermediate Football Championship, beating Ellistown in the final. In 2013 the senior footballers reached the final of the 2013 Kildare Senior Football League Division 1 only to lose out on the day to Moorefield. 
In 2016 Confey Senior Footballers won the Kildare Senior Division 1 League beating Athy 1-08 to 0-8.
They currently compete in Division 1.

Confey players that have represented Kildare GAA; 

Senior Footballer's; Colm Quinn (2001–2002). Hugh Lynch (2006, 2010–2015). James Gately (2011, 2014). David Slattery 2015- 2020

Junior Footballer's; Daragh Nolan (2001). Frank Ryder (2002–2004). Colm Quinn & John Malone (2004). Frank Barry (2009). Hugh Lynch (2009–2010). James Gately (2011). Joe Kehoe, Conor Feeney & Tomás McCann (2012).

Under 21 Footballer's; Frank Ryder (2001). Hugh Lynch (2004–2005). Tomás McCann (2009).

Minor Footballer's; Ciarán Ganley (2000). Hugh Lynch (2001–2002). Conor Hughes (2004). Patrick Griffin (2002-2003). Brian Corscadden (2002-2003).

Bainisteoir:
 Tony Kelly 1993–1998
 Mick Marron 1999–2002
 Stephen Kinneavy 2003–2005
 David Lambert 2006–2007
 Leo Turley 2008–2009
 Ronan Quinn 2010–2013
 Mark Byrne 2014–2015
 David Burke 2016–2017
 Fergal Foran 2018
 Kiersey O'Neill 2019-2020
 Joe Keogh 2021-

County Players
 David Slattery – Kildare footballer & Hurler
 Paul Divilly –   Kildare hurler
 Paul Feerick -   Kildare Hurler
 Colm Chan    -   Kildare Hurler

Hurling
The club formed its first adult team in March 1993. In its first year the adult men's team reached the junior hurling league semi-final and captured the Junior 'B' hurling championship, defeating Moorefield on a scoreline of 0–13 to 1–5. In 1997 the club won the S.H.L. Div. 2 title, defeating Clane 3–11 to 1–7. The club had to wait until 2002 to capture its next adult hurling titles when the club, led by captain Alfie Keenahan, won both the Intermediate League and Championship. The club has competed in the Senior Hurling championship ever since. In 2005 Confey lost to Celbridge in the semi-final, the furthest the team had reached in the competition to that point. The following year they were finalists, but were defeated by Ardclough. The club won its first Senior County Hurling Title in 2007, defeating Coill Dubh 3–8 to 0–10. The team was captained by Kieran Divilly, and man of the match was Oisin Lynch who scored 0–5 on the day. The team in 2007 was managed by Liam Dowd, who was aided by selectors Tony Hoare and Eamon Fennelly and 'special advisors' Davy Fitzgerald and Bertie Sherlock. Confey added a second Kildare Senior Hurling Championship in 2008 beating Coill Dubh in the final while also adding their first senior hurling league division 1 title. Confey won the 2012 Kildare Senior Hurling Championship, their third, beating Celbridge in the final avenging the previous years final defeat to the same team. 2014 saw Confey beat Éire Óg-Chorrachoill in the Senior Hurling League Final. The club fielded a second adult team for the first time in 2004 and in their first year they captured the Junior hurling league and championship. Since then the club's second team play in the Intermediate league and championship. 

Confey players that have represented Kildare as Senior Hurlers;
Daragh Nolan (2002–2003, 2007). Kieran Divilly (2003–2014). Paul Keegan (2003, 2011). Robert Connolly (2003, 2011). Michael Divilly (2005, 2008–2011). Oisin Lynch (2006–2009). Kevin Chan (2007–2009, 2011-2012). Paul Divilly (2006–2009, 2012–2021). Colm Chan (2015) Luke Quinn (2017) Frank Bass (2018)

Kildare Under 21 Hurlers; Adrian Kinsella (1999-2000), Kieran Divilly & Daragh Nolan (2001). Kevin Chan , Patrick Nolan, Michael Divilly & Mark Fennelly (2005). Oisin Lynch (2005–2007). Paul Divilly (2005–2006). Philip Quigley (2006–2007). Eoin Fitzpatrick & Cillian MacSuibhne (2007). John O'Neill, Padraig Keegan, David Slattery (2009). Colm Chan (2009–2010) Luke Quinn (2016) Frank Bass (2015-2017)

Kildare Minor Hurlers; Adrian Kinsella (1997-1998), Michael Divilly & Shane Doyle (2002), Conor Feeney, Oisin Lynch, Cillian MacSuibhne, Paul Divilly, Eoin Fitzpatrick & Philip Quigley (2004). Colm Chan, David O'Neill & Padraig Keegan (2007). Daire Casey (2013). Frank Bass (2014)

Camogie
Confey fielded their first under-12 team in 1994 and have participated at most under-age level..Their facility at Cope Bridge was opened on 16 May 1998.

Ladies Football
Confey qualified for the All Ireland intermediate club final in 2000, losing to Rockchapel of Cork. They won two Kildare club championships in succession.

Honours
Kildare GAA Club of the Year 2004

Adult Football
 Leinster Intermediate Club Football Championship: Winners: 2006
 Kildare Intermediate Football Championship: Winners: 2006, 2011
 Kildare Intermediate Football Championship: Runner-up: 2004, 2010
 Junior `A` Football Championship Winners: 2003  Runner-Up 2001
 Kildare Senior Football League Division 1 Winners: 2016  Runners-Up 2013
 Kildare Senior Football League Division 2 Winners: 2004 Runner Up: 2001, 2010
 Kildare Senior Football League Division 3 Runner-up: 1996
 Kildare Senior Football "Aldridge" Cup Winners (1) 2008
 Kildare Junior Football "Keogh" Cup Winners (1) 2002
 Jack Higgins Cup Winners (1)  2003
 Kildare Senior Football Reserve – B Championship: (1) 2015
 Kildare Senior Football Reserve – B Championship Runner Up: 2016
 Kildare Senior Football Reserve – C Championship: (1) 2014
 Kildare Intermediate Football B Championship Winners: 2006 
 Kildare Intermediate Football B Championship Runner-up: 2006
 Kildare Senior Football League Division 4 Winners: 2007, 2012
 Kildare Senior Football League Division 4 (North) Winners: 2012
 Kildare Senior Football League Division 4 (North) Runner Up: 2015
 Kildare Senior Football League Division 4 Runner Up: 2008, 
 Kildare Junior Football League Division 2 Winners: 1998 
 Kildare Junior Football C Championship: (1) 2004 
 Under 21 Football A Championship Runner-up: 2001 2003 2004
 Kildare Under-21 Football B Championship Winners: 1995
 Kildare Minor `A` Football Championship Winners: 2002
 Kildare Minor `B` Football Championship Runner Up: 1992, 2013
 Kildare Minor Football League Division – 1 Winners: 2002, 2003
 Kildare Minor Football League Division – 4 Winners: 1994, 1996
 Kildare Minor Football League Div. 4 Winners: 1994

Adult Hurling
 Kildare Senior Hurling Championship Winners; 2007, 2008, 2012
 Kildare Senior Hurling Championship: Runner-up: 2006 2011
 Kildare Senior Hurling League Division 1 Winners; 2008, 2014, 2018, 2021
 Kildare Senior Hurling League Division 2 Winners; 1997
 Kildare Intermediate Hurling Championship (1) 2002
 Kildare Intermediate Hurling B Championship: (1) 2013 
 Kildare Intermediate Hurling League Championship: (2) 2002, 2013
 Kildare Junior Hurling Championship (1) 2004
 Kildare Junior Hurling League (1) 2004
 Kildare Under 21 Hurling Championship (2) 2004, 2008 
 Kildare Minor Hurling Championship Winners; 2003
 Kildare Minor Hurling Championship Runner-up: 2011
 Kildare Minor Hurling B Championship Winners; 1998
 Kildare Minor Hurling B Championship Runner Up; 2016 (St. Columba's (Confey & Leixlip))
 Kildare Minor Hurling League Division 1 Winners; 2002, 2003, 2004
 Kildare Minor Hurling League Division – 2 Winners; 2013 (St. Columba's (Confey & Leixlip))

Ladies Football
 Leinster Club Ladies Intermediate Football Championship: (1) 2000
 Kildare Ladies Junior Football Championship: (1) 1999
 Kildare Ladies Senior Football Championship: (2) 2009, 2012
 Kildare Ladies Intermediate Football Championship: (2) 2000, 2005
 Kildare Ladies Junior Football Championship: (1) 1999
 Kildare Ladies Senior Football League Division 1 Winners (2) 2012, 2016
 Kildare Ladies Minor Football League Division 1 Winners (3) 2000, 2001, 2002

See also
 Davy Burke

Bibliography
 Kildare GAA: A Centenary History, by Eoghan Corry, CLG Chill Dara, 1984,  hb  pb
 Kildare GAA yearbook, 1972, 1974, 1978, 1979, 1980 and 2000– in sequence especially the Millennium yearbook of 2000
 Soaring Sliothars: Centenary of Kildare Camogie 1904–2004 by Joan O'Flynn Kildare County Camogie Board.

References

External links
Confey GAA Website
Kildare GAA site
Kildare GAA club sites
Kildare on Hoganstand.com

Gaelic games clubs in County Kildare
Gaelic football clubs in County Kildare
Hurling clubs in County Kildare
Sport in Leixlip